Parluk (also Romanized as Parlūk and Por Lūk; also known as Parlek, Pīr Look and Pīrlūk) is a village in Deymkaran Rural District, Salehabad District, Bahar County, Hamadan Province, Iran. At the 2006 census, its population was 2,027, in 381 families.

References 

Populated places in Bahar County